Victor Vincent Fuentes (born February 10, 1983) is an American singer-songwriter and musician, best known for his work with the American post-hardcore rock band Pierce the Veil.

Biography
Fuentes was born on February 10, 1983, in San Diego, California, to Vivian K. Fuentes and Victor Gamboa Fuentes, a painter and former jazz musician. He has a younger brother, Mike Fuentes, two half-brothers, and one half-sister. He is related to Nick Martin, who currently plays in Sleeping with Sirens, and Coal Flower, a lesser-known independent artist.

At age 7, Fuentes learned to play guitar. After attending Mission Bay High School, he attended San Diego State University, where he studied graphic design. He quit studying after his former band Before Today was signed to Equal Vision Records.

He wrote the song "A Match Into Water" on their third album, Collide with the Sky, for his former girlfriend who was suffering from breast cancer.

He is friends with Curtis Peoples, who was co-writer of the gold single "King for a Day". They played together in a band called 3 Simple Words while attending high school.

Musical career 

During his time at Mission Bay High School Fuentes played in a local punk band called 3 Simple Words alongside Curtis Peoples, who later worked together with Pierce the Veil on some songs, including "King for a Day".

In 1998 he formed a band called Early Times with his younger brother Mike. After releasing three EPs the band was forced to rename due to copyright violation. The group changed their name to "Before Today". After signing a recording contract with Equal Vision Records the band released their only album, A Celebration of an Ending, in 2004 before breaking up two years later.

In 2007 the duo released their debut record, A Flair for the Dramatic, with the newformed band called Pierce the Veil. With this band Fuentes released three more albums, Selfish Machines, Collide with the Sky, and Misadventures after integrating bassist Jaime Preciado and guitarist, Tony Perry. He toured in North America, South America, Australia, Asia and Europe several times, played at big music festivals such as Rock am Ring and Rock im Park, Reading and Leeds, Warped Tour, Soundwave Festival and Slam Dunk Festival. On concert tours Fuentes shared stage with acts including Bring Me the Horizon, All Time Low, Sleeping with Sirens, Tonight Alive and A Day to Remember.

Alongside his brother, he was involved in the short-lived supergroup Isles & Glaciers with musicians including Jonny Craig, Craig Owens, Brian Southall, Nick Martin and Matt Goddard. After playing only one show at SXSW 2009 and releasing only one EP (The Hearts of Lonely People) in 2010, the band broke up.

Fuentes was also a session guitarist for a short North American tour with the short-lived pop punk band Cinematic Sunrise.

In November 2022, Fuentes was featured on Cavetown's album "worm food" on track 4, titled "a kind thing to do".

Songwriting 
Fuentes has written songs with the likes of Tom Denney, Curtis Peoples and Dave Yaden. He doesn't have a concept for writing his songs but gains inspiration from familiar situations, personal experiences in relationships, touring and friends.

He has written songs inspired by fans, such as "Bulls in the Bronx", on the album Collide with the Sky. This was written for Olivia Penpraze, who committed suicide in April 2012. Her friends wrote a letter to the band about what had happened. Penpraze had been a fan of Pierce the Veil. The band dedicated one song on Collide with the Sky to the young Australian, but it isn't sure definitively whether it is "Bulls in the Bronx" or "Hold On Till May".

"I Don't Care If You Are Contagious", from the second album, Selfish Machines, was also a fan-inspired song. The musicians said in an interview with music magazine Alternative Press that a young girl had contacted the band, writing that her boyfriend had died in a car accident, and that they had met for the first time during a Pierce the Veil concert. Fuentes wrote this song as a present for her.

"Million Dollar Houses (The Painter)" from the same record is dedicated to his parents. The song is about their parents, who never separated even in a time when the family had almost nothing.

Many fans thanked the band for the songs they wrote. They certify their lyrics would have a "healing effect". Some listeners prevented self-harm while listening to his lyrics.

Vocals 
Vic Fuentes is well known for his high vocal range, which was compared to Claudio Sanchez from Coheed and Cambria by Elmar Salmutter, writing for the German Metal Hammer magazine.

Accolades 
 Alternative Press Music Awards
 2014: Best vocalist (nominated)
 2015: Best vocalist (nominated)

Discography

Before Today
A Celebration of an Ending (2004)

Pierce the Veil

A Flair for the Dramatic (2007)
Selfish Machines (2010) 
Collide with the Sky (2012)
 Misadventures (2016)
 The Jaws of Life (2023)

Isles & Glaciers
 The Hearts of Lonely People (2010)

Guest appearances

References

External links

 
1983 births
Living people
American rock guitarists
American male guitarists
American male singers
American rock singers
Hispanic and Latino American musicians
Musicians from San Diego
American musicians of Mexican descent
Pierce the Veil members
Guitarists from California
21st-century American singers
Isles & Glaciers members